Achille Robin (born 20 May 1997) is a French professional footballer who plays as a defender for MLS Next Pro club Tacoma Defiance.

Career

Early career
Robin played as part of the Chamois Niortais youth academy from 2012 to 2015. He later had spells in the lower leagues with Les Herbiers VF between 2015 and 2016, where he made 15 appearances in the Championnat National 3, then joining Les Herbiers VF for a further two seasons, appearing 40 times for the club's reserve team in the National 3.

College 
In 2018, Robin moved to the United States to play college soccer at Bowling Green State University. During his time with the Falcons, Robin made 48 appearances, scoring seven goals and adding five assists. In 2019, Robin was named All-MAC First Team, selected to the MAC's All-Tournament Team and named to the United Soccer Coaches All-Region Second Team. Robin served as team captain in 2020, where he went on to play every second of every game for the two straight seasons. He was also named one of the thirty candidates for the Senior CLASS Award. For the second straight season, Robin was named to the All-MAC First Team and the USC All-North Region Second Team. In 2021, Robin opted to transfer to the University of Washington to play his senior season, going on to appear 21 times for the Huskies, helping the team to the College Cup Final for the first time in program history.

While at college, Robin also played in the USL League Two with Dayton Dutch Lions in 2019, and Chicago FC United in 2021.

MLS SuperDraft 
On 11 January 2022, Robin was drafted 43rd overall in the 2022 MLS SuperDraft by Seattle Sounders FC.

Tacoma Defiance 
On 18 March 2022, it was announced that Robin had signed with Seattle's MLS Next Pro side Tacoma Defiance ahead of the league's inaugural season. He made 17 regular season appearances for Tacoma during their 2022 season, helping the team to qualify for the season playoffs.

References

External links 
 

1997 births
Living people
Association football defenders
Bowling Green Falcons men's soccer players
Championnat National 3 players
Chicago FC United players
Dayton Dutch Lions players
French footballers
MLS Next Pro players
USL League Two players
La Roche VF players
Les Herbiers VF players
Seattle Sounders FC draft picks
Tacoma Defiance players
Washington Huskies men's soccer players
French expatriate footballers
French expatriate sportspeople in the United States
Expatriate soccer players in the United States